Crozon is a commune in the department of Finistère and the administrative region of Brittany, northwestern France.  As well as the town of Crozon, the village of Morgat is part of the commune.

Crozon is located on the Crozon peninsula on the west coast of Finistère. It is bordered by the communes of Camaret-sur-Mer to the west, Roscanvel to the northwest, Lanvéoc to the north, Landévennec to the north-east and Telgruc-sur-Mer to the east. Crozon is the chef-lieu of the arrondissement of Châteaulin. Louis Jouvet, a French actor, was born in Crozon in 1887.

Crozon harbours Île Longue, the base of the French strategic nuclear submarines.

Tourism
In common with many other French towns, Crozon has a number of fêtes and festivals at various times of year. Probably the best known festival held in Crozon is the Festival du Bout du Monde ("World's End Festival"), a live music festival held on the first weekend in August.

Crozon has various shops and a couple of supermarkets for daily needs. There is also a local produce market most mornings in front of the church. A bigger market called 'la Foire' takes place every first Wednesday of the month.

Population
Inhabitants of Crozon are called in French Crozonnais.

Breton language
In 2008, 4.58% of primary-school children attended bilingual schools, where Breton language is taught alongside French.

International relations
Crozon is twinned with the following places:
 Sligo, Ireland
 Ulm, Germany
 Pralognan-la-Vanoise, France

See also
Communes of the Finistère department
Parc naturel régional d'Armorique

References

Site with map and info on Finistère communes

External links

 Commune's website
more than 500 photos of the Crozon Peninsula
 |Crozon  Cultural Heritage
 Maritime Heritage : Crozon-Morgat's fishing history and boats

Communes of Finistère